Ellard is an unincorporated community in Calhoun County, Mississippi, United States.

History
Ellard was formerly home to Ellard High School.

A post office operated under the name Ellard from 1895 to 1908.

References

Unincorporated communities in Calhoun County, Mississippi
Unincorporated communities in Mississippi